Kir of Moab is mentioned in the Hebrew Bible as one of the two main strongholds of Moab, the other being Ar. It is probably the same as the city called Kir-haresh, Kir-hareseth, and Kir-heres. The word Kir alludes to a wall or fortress. It is identified with the later city Al Karak.

According to the second Book of Kings, after the death of Ahab, king of Israel, Mesha, the king of Moab (see Mesha Stele), threw off allegiance to the king of Israel. Ahab's successor, Jehoram, in seeking to regain his supremacy over Moab, entered into an alliance with Jehoshaphat, king of Judah, and with the king of Edom. The three kings lead their armies against Mesha, who was driven back to seek refuge in Kir-haraseth. The Moabites were driven to despair. Mesha then took his eldest son, who would have reigned in his stead, and sacrificed him as a burnt-offering on the wall of the fortress in the sight of the allied armies. “There was great indignation against Israel: and they departed from him, and returned to their own land(s).” The invaders evacuated the land of Moab, and Mesha achieved the independence of his country (-). Josephus said the kings pitied the need which the Moabite monarch had felt when he offered up his child, and so withdrew.

Kir is also the name of another place in the Hebrew Bible, to which Tiglath-Pileser carried the Aramean captives after he had taken the city of Damascus. It is also the location from which the Arameans are said to have originated from ).  mentions it along with Elam. Some scholars have supposed that Kir is a variant of Cush (Susiana), on the south of Elam.

See also
Isaiah 15, prophecy against Kir and Moab

References 

Hebrew Bible cities
Moab
Book of Isaiah

sv:Kir-Moab